Objet décoratif carré avec dieux tahitiens (Square Ornament with Tahitian gods) is an 1893-1895 terracotta sculpture by Paul Gauguin, now in the Musée d'Orsay, Paris. It depicts Tahitian goddesses on both sides; one  the woman is alert and confronting the viewer, on the other the goddess appears to be at rest and sleeping.

Notes

External links
At the Musée d'Orsay

Ceramic sculptures
Nude art
Paul Gauguin
Sculptures of goddesses
Sculptures of the Musée d'Orsay